Events in the year 1995 in Japan. It corresponds to Heisei 7 (平成7年) in the Japanese calendar.

Incumbents
 Emperor: Akihito
 Prime Minister: Tomiichi Murayama (S–Ōita)
 Chief Cabinet Secretary: Kōzō Igarashi (S–Hokkaidō) until August 8, Kōken Nosaka (S–Tottori)
 Chief Justice of the Supreme Court: Ryōhachi Kusaba until November 7, Tōru Miyoshi
 President of the House of Representatives: Takako Doi (S–Hyōgo)
 President of the House of Councillors: Bunbē Hara (L–Tokyo) until July 22, Jūrō Saitō (L–Mie) from August 4
 Diet sessions: 132nd (regular, January 20 to June 18), 133rd (extraordinary, August 4 to August 8), 134th (extraordinary, September 29 to December 15)

Governors
Aichi Prefecture: Reiji Suzuki 
Akita Prefecture: Kikuji Sasaki 
Aomori Prefecture: Masaya Kitamura (until 26 February); Morio Kimura (starting 26 February)
Chiba Prefecture: Takeshi Numata 
Ehime Prefecture: Sadayuki Iga 
Fukui Prefecture: Yukio Kurita
Fukuoka Prefecture: Hachiji Okuda (until 22 April); Wataru Asō (starting 23 April)
Fukushima Prefecture: Eisaku Satō
Gifu Prefecture: Taku Kajiwara 
Gunma Prefecture: Hiroyuki Kodera 
Hiroshima Prefecture: Yūzan Fujita 
Hokkaido: Takahiro Yokomichi (until 22 April); Tatsuya Hori (starting 22 April)
Hyogo Prefecture: Toshitami Kaihara 
Ibaraki Prefecture: Masaru Hashimoto 
Ishikawa Prefecture: Masanori Tanimoto
Iwate Prefecture: Iwao Kudō (until 29 April); Hiroya Masuda (starting 30 April)
Kagawa Prefecture: Jōichi Hirai 
Kagoshima Prefecture: Yoshiteru Tsuchiya 
Kanagawa Prefecture: Kazuji Nagasu (until 22 April); Hiroshi Okazaki (starting 23 April)
Kochi Prefecture: Daijiro Hashimoto 
Kumamoto Prefecture: Joji Fukushima 
Kyoto Prefecture: Teiichi Aramaki 
Mie Prefecture: Ryōzō Tagawa (until 20 April); Masayasu Kitagawa (starting 21 April)
Miyagi Prefecture: Shirō Asano 
Miyazaki Prefecture: Suketaka Matsukata 
Nagano Prefecture: Gorō Yoshimura 
Nagasaki Prefecture: Isamu Takada 
Nara Prefecture: Yoshiya Kakimoto
Niigata Prefecture: Ikuo Hirayama 
Oita Prefecture: Morihiko Hiramatsu 
Okayama Prefecture: Shiro Nagano 
Okinawa Prefecture: Masahide Ōta
Osaka Prefecture: Kazuo Nakagawa (until 22 April); Knock Yokoyama (starting 23 April)
Saga Prefecture: Isamu Imoto 
Saitama Prefecture: Yoshihiko Tsuchiya
Shiga Prefecture: Minoru Inaba 
Shiname Prefecture: Nobuyoshi Sumita 
Shizuoka Prefecture: Yoshinobu Ishikawa 
Tochigi Prefecture: Fumio Watanabe
Tokushima Prefecture: Toshio Endo 
Tokyo: Shun'ichi Suzuki (until 23 April); Yukio Aoshima (starting 23 April)
Tottori Prefecture: Yuji Nishio 
Toyama Prefecture: Yutaka Nakaoki
Wakayama Prefecture: Shirō Kariya (until 22 November); Isamu Nishiguchi (starting 23 November) 
Yamagata Prefecture: Kazuo Takahashi 
Yamaguchi Prefecture: Toru Hirai 
Yamanashi Prefecture: Ken Amano

Events

 January 17 – The 6.9  Great Hanshin earthquake shakes the southern Hyōgo Prefecture with a maximum Shindo of VII, leaving 5,502–6,434 people dead, and 251,301–310,000 displaced.
 February 21 – An MSDF helicopter falls into the Bungo Channel, causing 11 deaths.
 March 20 - Members of the Aum Shinrikyo religious cult carry out a Sarin gas attack on the Tokyo subway, killing 12 and injuring more than 6,000.
 March 30 – A police officer tries to assassinate Takaji Kunimatsu, Commissioner General of the National Police Agency, outside his home in Arakawa Ward, Tokyo.
 April 9 - In a series of gubernatorial elections held across Japan, Yukio Aoshima and Knock Yokoyama become governors of Tokyo and Osaka respectively.
 May 12 – A bomb goes off in a men's public lavatory on the third floor of the Terminal 2 building of New Tokyo International Airport, Narita.
 May 16 - Japanese police besiege the headquarters of Aum Shinrikyo in Kamikuishiki, Yamanashi Prefecture at the foot of Mount Fuji and arrest cult leader Shoko Asahara.
 May 31 - Governor of Tokyo Yukio Aoshima cancels a costly "World City" exposition that Governor Shun'ichi Suzuki planned to have held in Odaiba in 1996, which had formed the bulk of the basis for Aoshima's gubernatorial campaign. 
 June 22 - Japanese police rescue 365 hostages from a hijacked All Nippon Airways  Flight 857 (Boeing 747-200) at Hakodate airport. The hijacker, Fumio Kutsumi, was armed with a screw driver and demanded the release of Shoko Asahara.
 July 23 - House of Councillors election held. The recently created New Frontier Party replaced the Japanese Socialist Party as the second largest political party in Japan, and entered coalition with the Liberal Democratic Party. The Socialists lost many seats in this election.
 July 30 – During an armed robbery at a  Hachioji, Tokyo supermarket, three female employees are killed.
 September 4 – 1995 Okinawa rape incident: Three U.S. servicemen serving at Camp Hansen on Okinawa kidnap and gang rape a 12-year-old Japanese girl. The incident led to further debate over the continued presence of U.S. forces in Japan.
 October 26 - Mitsubishi Motors releases the Mitsubishi Pajero Junior mini SUV.
 November 18 - November 19 - APEC summit held in Osaka, the first in Japan.

Births

January 16 - Takumi Minamino, footballer
January 25 - Masaya Matsumoto, footballer
January 26 – Seiya Matsubara, professional baseball player 
January 30 - Misaki Iwasa, singer
February 3 - Tao Tsuchiya, actress
February 8 - Naoki Yoshikawa, professional baseball player 
February 10 - Haruna Kawaguchi, actress and model
February 12 
Ryuju Hino, figure skater
Rina Kawaei, singer
February 13 - Ayame Koike, actress
February 16
Nikki Havenaar, footballer
Mayu Matsuoka, actress
March 6 - Aimyon, singer-songwriter
March 7 - Fuma Kikuchi, actor, dancer and singer
March 10 - Yui Sakuma, model and actress
March 11 - Kazuki Fukai, footballer
March 12 - Kanon Fukuda, singer and voice actress
March 13 - Ryutarou Akimoto, actor and model
March 15 - Momoka Ariyasu, singer
March 17 - Akari Hayami, actress, model and singer
April 6 - Ryutaro Morimoto, singer
April 14 - Yukiko Fujisawa, figure skater
April 19 - Akira Saitō, actress
June 4 - Shiori Tamai, singer
June 8 - Akari Saho, musician
June 12 - Mao Murakami, dancer
June 17 - Aoi Morikawa, actress and model
July 2 - Tomoko Kanazawa, pop singer
July 30 - Yuhi, wrestler
August 8 - Miyabi Oba, figure skater
August 15 - Yui Ogura, actress, pop idol and singer
August 24 - Anna Doi, sprinter
September 12 - Kako Tomotaki, figure skater
September 14 - Kazuto Taguchi, professional baseball player
September 22
Ai Hazuki, actress
Taisuke Yamaoka, professional baseball player
September 23 - Aimi Kobayashi, pianist
October 26 - Yuta Nakamoto, pop idol and singer
October 29 - Taku Hiraoka, snowboarder
November 2 - Rei Takahashi, professional baseball player
November 7 - Runa Natsui, actress
November 19 - Asuka Teramoto, gymnast
December 2 - Inori Minase, actress, voice actress and singer
December 3 - Anna Iriyama, singer
December 15 - Yoshihide Kiryū, track and field sprinter
December 29 - Rina Ikoma, singer

Deaths
February 24
Tatsumi Kumashiro, film director (b. 1927)
Hideko Maehata, swimmer (b. 1914)
March 19 – Yasuo Yamada, voice actor (b. 1932)
July 5 – Takeo Fukuda, politician (b. 1905)
August 25 – Setsuko, Princess Chichibu, wife of Prince Chichibu (b. 1909)
September 25 – Kei Tomiyama, actor, voice actor and narrator (b. 1938)
November 26 – Toshia Mori, actress (b. 1912)

See also
 1995 in Japanese television
 List of Japanese films of 1995

References

 
Years of the 20th century in Japan
Japan